The Michael Hill International Violin Competition is a biennial music competition for violinists aged between 18 and 28. It was founded by Michael Hill in 2001 as the Michael Hill World Violin Competition. Hill remains a major sponsor, claiming that "It is my dream that New Zealand will one day become a much more balanced society with not just wonderful sport – but also wonderful classical music." In 2004, the event became a member of the World Federation of International Music Competitions.

The event is held in New Zealand, with the first two semi-final rounds of competition conducted in Queenstown and the third and final rounds held in Auckland. There is a total prize pool of NZ$100,000, with the winner receiving $40,000. In 2009, the events gained about $500,000 worth of sponsorship.

Special guests at the competition have included Prime Minister of New Zealand Helen Clark, and Minister for Arts, Culture and Heritage Christopher Finlayson.

Laureates

References

External links
 Michael Hill International Violin Competition

Music competitions in New Zealand
2001 establishments in New Zealand